International courts are formed by treaties between nations or under the authority of an international organization such as the United Nations and include ad hoc tribunals and permanent institutions but exclude any courts arising purely under national authority.

Definition 
An international court is an international organization, or a body of an international organization, that hears cases in which one party may be a state or international organization (or body thereof), and which is composed of independent judges who follow predetermined rules of procedure to issue binding decisions on the basis of international law.

History 
Early examples of international courts include the Nuremberg and Tokyo tribunals established in the aftermath of World War II. Several such international courts are presently located in The Hague in the Netherlands, most importantly the International Court of Justice (ICJ), and the International Criminal Court (ICC). Further international courts exist elsewhere, usually with their jurisdiction restricted to a particular country, a global or regional intergovernmental or supranational organisation, or historic issue, such as the International Criminal Tribunal for Rwanda that deals with the genocide in Rwanda. In addition to international tribunals created to address crimes committed during genocides and civil war, ad hoc courts and tribunals combining international and domestic strategies have also been established on a situational basis. Examples of these “hybrid tribunals” are the Special Court for Sierra Leone, Special Tribunal for Lebanon, Special Panels of the Dili District Court in East Timor, and the Extraordinary Chambers in the Courts of Cambodia.

Privileges and immunities 
Judges and high-level staff of such courts may be afforded diplomatic immunity if their governing authority allows.

List of international courts

List of hybrid tribunals

Lectures 
 Lecture by Yuval Shany (Yuval Shany) entitled Assessing the Effectiveness of International Courts: A Goal-based Approach in the Lecture Series of the United Nations Audiovisual Library of International Law
 Lecture by Sir Elihu Lauterpacht entitled The Role of the International Judge in the Lecture Series of the United Nations Audiovisual Library of International Law
 Lecture by Kenneth Keith entitled Aspects of the Judicial Process in National and International Courts and Tribunals in the Lecture Series of the United Nations Audiovisual Library of International Law
 Lecture by Mark Weston Janis entitled Protestants, Progress and Peace: the 19th Century Movement for an International Court and Congress: Early Drafts of Today's International Court and the United Nations in the Lecture Series of the United Nations Audiovisual Library of International Law

References

External links 
 Project on International Courts and Tribunals, which maintains a second website focused on Africa at 
 United Nations Rule of Law: Tribunals & Other Mechanisms , on the relationship between international courts and the rule of law.

 
Courts by type
Supreme courts